The 1990 Monaco Grand Prix was a Formula One motor race held on 27 May 1990 at Monaco. It was the fourth race of the 1990 Formula One World Championship and the 48th Monaco Grand Prix.

The race was won by Brazilian driver Ayrton Senna, driving a McLaren-Honda. Senna started from pole position, led every lap and set the fastest race lap, en route to his second consecutive Monaco win and third in all. French driver Jean Alesi finished second in a Tyrrell-Ford, with Senna's Austrian teammate Gerhard Berger third.

Qualifying

Pre-qualifying report
The four successful pre-qualifiers in the one-hour Thursday morning session were the same four drivers as at the previous race at Imola, in the same order. The Larrousse-Lola cars finished first and second for the third time in a row, with Éric Bernard again outpacing his teammate Aguri Suzuki. The Osella of Olivier Grouillard was third fastest, followed by Roberto Moreno in the EuroBrun.

The AGS drivers were frozen out in fifth and sixth, with Gabriele Tarquini considerably faster than Yannick Dalmas on this occasion. Seventh was Claudio Langes in the second EuroBrun, six seconds off Bernard's pace. The other two runners were far behind; Bertrand Gachot was over twelve seconds adrift in the Coloni after another engine failure, with the team now in some disarray, but still nearly two seconds faster than the Life, driven again by Bruno Giacomelli. This time, however, the Italian managed to complete a stint of seven laps and return to the pits without breaking down. Well off the pace, Giacomelli went back out on to the circuit and completed another lap before the W12 engine failed.

Pre-qualifying classification

Qualifying report
There were no surprises in qualifying with Ayrton Senna taking pole from his rival Alain Prost. Jean Alesi continued to impress in his Tyrrell, qualifying third ahead of Riccardo Patrese. Row three was formed of Gerhard Berger and Thierry Boutsen; Nigel Mansell lined up seventh alongside the Minardi of Pierluigi Martini, while Emanuele Pirro and Nelson Piquet rounded out the top ten. Young Australian driver David Brabham qualified in 25th, thus making his first Formula One race start.

Qualifying classification

Race

Race report
At the start there was an overly long delay between the red and green lights, which caused the drivers to be a little more agitated than usual, resulting in an accident between Prost and Berger at the Mirabeau corner. The track was blocked and the race had to be stopped. At the second start everything went to plan and Senna led from Prost, Alesi, Berger, Patrese and Boutsen, with Pirro being the first retirement when his engine blew on the opening lap. Eighth-placed Nigel Mansell was the centre of action in the early stages, quickly passing Martini before setting off after Boutsen, but his overtaking attempt on the Belgian was unsuccessful as he touched the back of the Williams at the seafront chicane and had to limp back to the pits for a new front wing. At the front Senna led comfortably, even more so after Prost retired on lap 30 with battery problems. On lap 35, Piquet spun approaching Loewes Hairpin and stalled his engine; he received a push start from the marshals and was disqualified as a result. While Senna maintained his lead, there was action further back where Mansell was charging through the field. First he disposed of Derek Warwick and then managed to successfully pass Boutsen for fourth, as Alesi and Berger fought over second place. In the late stages Senna started to slow, which allowed Alesi and Berger to close up on him, but Senna's McLaren survived to the finish for his third career win at Monaco. Alesi was second, followed by Berger, Boutsen, Alex Caffi and the only other survivor, Éric Bernard, who had taken sixth place in the late stages after he had forced himself past Gregor Foitek's Onyx by pushing him into the wall. In doing so, Bernard earned his first point in Formula One. Despite not finishing the race, Foitek was classified seventh, his best F1 result.

Race classification

Championship standings after the race

Drivers' Championship standings

Constructors' Championship standings

References

Monaco Grand Prix
Monaco Grand Prix
Grand Prix
May 1990 sports events in Europe